Pinetown is a large area that is part of the eThekwini Metropolitan Municipality, inland from Durban in KwaZulu-Natal, South Africa. Pinetown is situated 16 km west of Durban at an elevation of 1,000 to 1,300 feet (305 to 395 m).

History
Pinetown was named after the governor of Natal, Sir Benjamin Pine. The town was established in 1850 around the Wayside Hotel, itself built in 1849 along the main wagon route between Durban and Pietermaritzburg. In the Victorian era Pinetown was known as health resort.

During the Second Boer War, the British built a concentration camp in Pinetown to house Boer women and children.

A number of German settlers made Pinetown their base and this accounts for the neighbourhood known as New Germany and the German Lutheran Church. Indeed, to this day imported German cakes and goodies pack the shelves at Christmas time in the Knowles Spar, the largest grocery store of Pinetown. One of the largest monasteries was located south of Pinetown in Mariannhill, home to the Mariannhill monastery founded by Abbott Francis Pfanner. The establishment of this monastery had huge influence in the expansion of the Catholic Church in KwaZulu Natal.

The area of Clermont was a solely black residential zone during the apartheid era, with land tenure being on a freehold basis unlike the state-owned townships elsewhere in the Durban vicinity. This meant residents enjoyed an atmosphere of freedom and this led to Clermont being a base for some well-known political activists during the apartheid era such as the lawyer Archie Gumede. Other personalities associated with Clermont are relatives of the leader of the world-renowned Ladysmith Black Mambazo musical group.

Geography 
Pinetown is located about 305 to 395 m above sea level on the banks of the uMbilo River and at the foot of the escarpment above Fields Hill to the west of the town. The town is situated about 16 km north-west of the city of Durban by road and 64 km south-east of the city of Pietermaritzburg by road.

Pinetown is bordered by the suburb of Wyebank in the north, the townships of KwaDabeka and Clermont in the north-east, the town of Westville to the east, the town of Queensburgh and the township of Chatsworth to the south-east, the township of Klaarwater to the south, the townships of Luganda, Sgubudwini, Mpola, Tshelimnyama and KwaNdengezi to the south-west and the town of Kloof to the north-west.

Boundaries

Pinetown is part of the larger eThekwini Municipality and, for voting purposes, falls within the IEC electoral Ward 18.

The area from Cowies Hill in the east, along Josiah Gumede (Old Main) Road/M1 to Westmead industrial area in the west, is commonly referred to as the Pinetown area; The foundations and structures of the original town can be found at the corner of Josiah Gumede (Old Main) Road and Stapleton Road.

Infrastructure

Road Transport
Pinetown has multiple access roads to all major freeways in the eThekwini Metro such as the N3, M7, M13 and M19. 

The N3 national highway is one of the main freeways running through Pinetown as well as one of the most important highways in South Africa linking Johannesburg, the economic hub of the country and Durban, the busiest port in the country. The N3 links Pinetown to Pietermaritzburg and Johannesburg in the north-west and Durban in the south-east. 

From Durban the N3 intersects with the M7 highway in Farmingham Ridge, starting as the Marianhill Toll Route and then passes the suburbs of Pinelands, Ashley, Mariannhill, Westmead and Mahogany Ridge before meeting the Mariannhill Toll Plaza on the outskirts of Pinetown. Access to the N3 from Pinetown is obtained through the M13 Paradise Valley Interchange (Exit 17), M7 Interchange (Exit 20), Henry Pennington/Richmond Road off-ramp (Exit 23) and the Stockville Road off-ramp (Exit 26). 

The M7 Solomon Mahlangu Drive is a metropolitan highway that runs from just south of the Pinetown Central Business District (CBD) at the intersection with the M19 St Johns Avenue (M13 Exit 17 interchange) to intersect with the N3 and then continuing south-eastwards linking to Queensburgh, the N2 (to Port Shepstone) and the Bluff in Durban. 

The M13 King Cetshwayo Highway is the main highway running through Pinetown, particularly bypassing the CBD to the south. The metropolitan highway is an important commuter route in Greater Durban metropolitan area, linking Durban to the Inner and Outer West suburbs of the metropolis. It links Pinetown to the Upper Highway areas of Kloof, Gillitts and Hillcrest in the north-west and Westville and Durban in the south-east. The M13 is also an alternative route to Pietermaritzburg for motorists avoiding to pass through the Mariannhill Toll Plaza on the N3, where motorists can join the N3 just south-west of Hillcrest.    

The M19 highway is a metropolitan freeway that runs from M13 Exit 17 interchange with the M7 highway and links the Pinetown/New Germany area to Westville North in the east and Durban in the south-east.

Other than the M7, M13 and M19 Pinetown has access to other metropolitan routes in the eThekwini Metro which include the M1 Henry Pennington Road (previously known as Richmond Road) to Klaarwater and Chatsworth in the south-west, M5 Otto Volek/Stapleton/Underwood Road to Queensburgh and Durban in the south-west, M31 Josiah Gumede Road to Westville in the east (via the M13) and the M34 Limpus Road/Hans Dettman Highway to Shallcross in the south

Public Transport 
The first phase of a rapid bus system, GO!Durban, was due for implementation in September 2019, but was postponed because the municipality is scared of the Taxi bosses. The first phase envisages a link between Pinetown CBD and KwaMashu’s Bridge City Mall.

Shopping mall
Pine Crest Centre, situated at 17 Kings Road, is the biggest retail center in town. It opened around 1988 as the Sanlam Center. In 2017 it was acquired by the JSE-listed company Vukile, and was upgraded to offer over 100 stores.

Education
One of five campuses of the University of KwaZulu-Natal is in Pinetown, on the corner of Richmond and Mariannhill Roads. The Edgewood campus was originally established in the 1970s as a college to train (mostly white) students as teachers for the apartheid government's schools serving the white community. The purpose-built facilities were superior to other colleges of education where students of other races were trained as teachers. The specialised facilities enabled the training of art, music, drama, science and physical education teachers, and included rooms with overhead viewing platforms for unobtrusive classroom lesson demonstrations. In 2001, as part of the central government's rationalisation of the higher education landscape, the Edgewood College of Education was incorporated into the University of Natal. Then in 2004, with the merger of the Universities of Natal and Durban-Westville to form the University of KwaZulu-Natal, Edgewood became the new University's 5th campus. Edgewood campus is wholly dedicated to the education of teachers and education professionals and is one of the largest producers of new teachers in South Africa. On this campus the University's School of Education offers a four-year full-time Bachelor of Education (B Ed) degree and one-year full-time Post Graduate Certificate in Education (PGCE) for those wanting a teaching qualification. Various other certificates are also offered as in-service training for teachers, as well as Honours, Masters and Doctoral degrees. The library collection is specially equipped to enable those studying education from undergraduate through to doctoral levels.

Schools

Schools in Pinetown include: 
 Pinetown Boys' High School 
 Pinetown Girls' High School
 Benjamin Pine Primary School
 Sarnia Primary School
 Highway College (independent)
 John Wesley School (independent)
 Pinetown Junior & Senior Primary School
 Browns School (special needs education)
 St Benedict School Pinetown (independent)
 Lyndhurst Primary School
 New Germany Primary School
 Ashley Primary School
 St Francis College (independent)
 Gelofte Skool, the only Afrikaans-medium school in the area
 Margot Fonteyn Secondary School
 Kloof High School
 Mariannridge Primary School
 Mariannridge Secondary School
 St Wendolins Primary school
 Kranskloof Primary School
 Ndengetho Secondary School
 Sarnia Primary School
 Mathinta Secondary School
 Thornwood Secondary School
 KwaSanti Public Secondary
 Nonopha Senior Primary school
 IsiZinda Secondary school
 Westmead Secondary school
 Bahlebonke Primary school
 Savannah Park Secondary
 Jubilee Primary school
 Wyebank Primary
 Wyebank Secondary

Pre-Schools
Pre-Schools in Pinetown include:
 Kokkewiet Pre Pimêre Skool - Afrikaans
 Stepping Stones Pre-Primary School - English
 Whizz Kidz Pre-Primary School - English
 Ehlophe Edu-Care School

Medical facilities
Pinetown's medical facilities include:
 St Mary's, a government hospital in Mariannhill
 Life Crompton Hospital, a private hospital

 Medicross, a private medical centre

Sport

Cricket club
Pinetown Cricket Club, established in 1873, is believed to be the oldest cricket club in KwaZulu-Natal and amongst the oldest in South Africa. The club, originally located at the Civic Centre in central Pinetown, has subsequently moved to Lahee Park. Under the chairmanship of former Pinetown mayor Vernon Hall, Lahee Park hosted ten first class games between 1974 and 1979. Former internationals Norman Crookes (twice selected for the Springbok squad) and Tertius Bosch have previously represented the club. Khaya Zondo and Cameron Delport from the 2010 Dolphins team have a close association with the club, as do KZN "B" cricketers Bruce Kruger and Kyle Buckthorp.

Comrades Marathon
Pinetown is situated on the route of the popular Comrades Marathon, which runs along the Old Main Road from Westville, over Cowies Hill past the Civic Centre and on to Fields Hill, and vice versa. This event always attracts hundreds of spectators who line the route every year to catch a glimpse of their friends and loved ones in the marathon.

References

External links
durban.gov.za 
St. Wendolins Ridge, Pinetown
Official Comrades Marathon Website

1850 establishments in the Colony of Natal
Populated places established in 1849
Populated places in eThekwini Metropolitan Municipality
Second Boer War concentration camps